Plumtree School is a boarding school for boys and girls in the Matabeleland region of Zimbabwe on the border with Botswana. Founded in 1902 by a railway mission, Plumtree School boards 500+ pupils. Recently the school announced it will start enrolling girls as of January 2016.

Historical background 

In 1897 a siding on the railway line between Mafeking and Bulawayo was named Plumtree. It lies on the watershed of the Western Matabeleland Highveld at an altitude of 1389 metres 100 kilometres from Bulawayo. During that time, the construction of the Cape-to-Cairo railway was underway and around 1902 the railway had just come through what was then the Bechuanaland Border.

The school was founded by the Railway Mission largely to cater for the children of the employees of the old Cape Government Railways at work on the Cape-to-Cairo railway who were resident alongside the line between Mafeking and Bulawayo. The first classes were held in a rondavel in the garden of Mr. And Mrs. S. J. Smith whose nine children formed the nucleus of the student body. Subsequently, classes were moved to the dining room of the Plumtree Hotel which doubled as the Station Refreshment room. A little later a large room was made available in the customs house.

In 1902 the school moved to the present site. The original  plot was steadily extended so that the school now occupies a one square kilometre site bordering on Plumtree village.

In 2015, the school was granted permission by the government to enrol girls in order to boost lowering enrolment figures. Although a handful of girls were pupils in its founding years, Plumtree School has been known as a boys school for more than a century.

Houses 

The school is at the edge of Plumtree. It is divided into four houses and one boarding hall:

Notable alumni 

 Ralph Mupita, MTN Group CEO 
 Iain Butchart, Zimbabwean cricketer
 Chris Dixon (1943-2011), Rhodesian Air Force pilot, also known as "Green Leader"
 Terry Duffin (headboy; 2000), Zimbabwean cricketer; former Zimbabwe Cricket captain
 Adrian Garvey, Zimbabwean/South African rugby player 
 Rollo Hayman, Rhodesian cabinet minister 
 Anthony Ireland (1997–2002), Zimbabwean cricketer
 David Lewis, Rhodesian cricketer 
 Henry Olonga (headboy; 1994), Zimbabwean cricketer
 Pat MacLachlan, Rhodesian rugby player
 Tony Pithey, Rhodesian/South African cricketer 
 David Pithey, Rhodesian/South African cricketer and Rhodes Scholar
 Des van Jaarsveldt, Rhodesian/South African rugby player
 Lieutenant-General Peter Walls (1927-2010), Rhodesian Army Commander
https://www.telegraph.co.uk/news/obituaries/military-obituaries/special-forces-obituaries/7913263/Lieutenant-General-Peter-Walls.html

References

External links 
 Old Prunitians site
 Old pictures of Plumtree High School, Zimbabwe
 Recent pictures of Plumtree High School, Zimbabwe (click on each picture for more)

Co-educational schools in Zimbabwe
High schools in Zimbabwe
Boarding schools in Zimbabwe
Day schools in Zimbabwe
Educational institutions established in 1902
1900s establishments in Southern Rhodesia
Education in Matabeleland South Province
1902 establishments in the British Empire